Richard Nancekivell was a Cornish rugby union player who competed in the Cornwall County team. He is remembered as the man who scored the winning tries in the 1991 County Rugby championships at Twickenham when Cornwall narrowly beat Yorkshire.

Nancekivell started his rugby career with Launceston (The Cornish All Blacks) along with his two brothers Roly and Eddie.

See also

 Rugby union in Cornwall

References

Living people
Cornish rugby union players
English rugby union players
Rugby union players from Cornwall
Year of birth missing (living people)